Colombia is the sixth richest country in the world for reptiles, and third richest in the Western Hemisphere.

Turtles 
The turtles (order: Chelonii or Testudines) number thirty-three species from nine families. Fifteen species are listed as vulnerable, endangered, or critically endangered. Three turtle species are listed as endemic.

Crocodilia

Squamata

See also
Fauna of Colombia

References

External links 
 
 
 
 

Reptiles
Colombia
Colombia